The Constitution of the United States is the supreme law of the United States of America. It superseded the Articles of Confederation, the nation's first constitution, in 1789. Originally comprising seven articles, it delineates the national frame and constraints of government. The Constitution's first three articles embody the doctrine of the separation of powers, whereby the federal government is divided into three branches: the legislative, consisting of the bicameral Congress (Article I); the executive, consisting of the president and subordinate officers (Article II); and the judicial, consisting of the Supreme Court and other federal courts (Article III). Article IV, Article V, and Article VI embody concepts of federalism, describing the rights and responsibilities of state governments, the states in relationship to the federal government, and the shared process of constitutional amendment. Article VII establishes the procedure subsequently used by the 13 states to ratify it. The Constitution of the United States is the oldest and longest-standing written and codified national constitution in force in the world today.

The drafting of the Constitution, referred to as its framing, was completed at the Constitutional Convention that took place in Philadelphia in 1787 from late May through mid-September. Delegates to the convention, chosen by the legislatures of 12 states (Rhode Island refused to send delegates), either were members of state legislatures or were appointed by the legislatures. The convention's initial mandate was limited to amending the Articles of Confederation, which had proven highly ineffective in meeting the young nation's needs. Almost immediately, however, delegates began considering measures to replace the Articles. The first proposal discussed, introduced by delegates from Virginia, called for a bicameral (two-house) Congress that was to be elected on a proportional basis based on state population, an elected chief executive, and an appointed judicial branch. An alternative to the Virginia Plan, known as the New Jersey Plan, also called for an elected executive but retained the legislative structure created by the Articles, a unicameral Congress where all states had one vote.

Ultimately, on June 19 delegates rejected the New Jersey Plan with three states voting in favor, seven against, and one divided. The plan's defeat led to a series of compromises centering primarily on two issues: slavery and proportional representation. The first of these pitted Northern states, where slavery was slowly being abolished, against Southern states, whose agricultural economies depended on slave labor. The issue of proportional representation was of similar concern to less populous states, which under the Articles had the same power as larger states. To satisfy interests in the South, particularly in Georgia and South Carolina, the delegates agreed to protect the slave trade, that is, the importation of slaves, for 20 years. Slavery was protected further by allowing states to count three-fifths of their slaves as part of their populations, for the purpose of representation in the federal government, and by requiring the return of escaped slaves to their owners, even if captured in states where slavery had been abolished. Finally, the delegates adopted the Connecticut Compromise, which proposed a Congress with proportional representation in the lower house and equal representation in the upper house (the Senate) giving each state two senators. While these compromises held the Union together and aided the Constitution's ratification, slavery continued for six more decades and the less populous states continue to have disproportional representation in the Senate and Electoral College.

Since the Constitution was ratified in 1789, it has been amended 27 times. The first ten amendments, known collectively as the Bill of Rights, offer specific protections of individual liberty and justice and place restrictions on the powers of government within the U.S. states. The majority of the 17 later amendments expand individual civil rights protections. Others address issues related to federal authority or modify government processes and procedures. Amendments to the United States Constitution, unlike ones made to many constitutions worldwide, are appended to the document. The original U.S. Constitution was handwritten on five pages of parchment by Jacob Shallus.
The first permanent constitution, it is interpreted, supplemented, and implemented by a large body of federal constitutional law and has influenced the constitutions of other nations.

Background

First government

From September 5, 1774, to March 1, 1781, the Continental Congress functioned as the provisional government of the United States. Delegates to the First (1774) and then the Second (1775–1781) Continental Congress were chosen largely through the action of committees of correspondence in various colonies rather than through the colonial governments of the Thirteen Colonies.

Articles of Confederation

The Articles of Confederation and Perpetual Union was the first constitution of the United States. The document was drafted by a committee appointed by the Second Continental Congress in mid-June of 1777 and was adopted by the full Congress in mid-November of that year. Ratification by the 13 colonies took more than three years and was completed March 1, 1781. The Articles gave little power to the central government. While the Confederation Congress had some decision-making abilities, it lacked enforcement powers. The implementation of most decisions, including amendments to the Articles, required legislative approval by all 13 of the newly-formed states.

Despite these limitations, based on the Congressional authority granted in Article 9, the league of states was considered as strong as any similar republican confederation ever formed. The chief problem was, in the words of George Washington, "no money". The Confederated Congress could print money but it was worthless, and while the Congress could borrow money, it could not pay it back. No state paid its share of taxes to support the government, and some paid nothing. A few states did meet the interest payments toward the national debt owed by their citizens, but nothing greater, and no interest was paid on debts owed foreign governments. By 1786, the United States was facing default on its outstanding debts.

Under the Articles, the United States had little ability to defend its sovereignty. Most of the troops in the nation's 625-man army were deployed facing non-threatening British forts on American soil. Soldiers were not being paid, some were deserting, and others were threatening mutiny. Spain closed New Orleans to American commerce, despite the protests of U.S. officials. When Barbary pirates began seizing American ships of commerce, the Treasury had no funds to pay toward ransom. If a military crisis required action, the Congress had no credit or taxing power to finance a response.

Domestically, the Articles of Confederation was failing to bring unity to the diverse sentiments and interests of the various states. Although the Treaty of Paris (1783) was signed between Great Britain and the U.S., and named each of the American states, various states proceeded to violate it. New York and South Carolina repeatedly prosecuted Loyalists for wartime activity and redistributed their lands. Individual state legislatures independently laid embargoes, negotiated directly with foreign authorities, raised armies, and made war, all violating the letter and the spirit of the Articles.

In September 1786, during an inter–state convention to discuss and develop a consensus about reversing the protectionist trade barriers that each state had erected, James Madison questioned whether the Articles of Confederation was a binding compact or even a viable government. Connecticut paid nothing and "positively refused" to pay U.S. assessments for two years. A rumor had it that a "seditious party" of New York legislators had opened a conversation with the Viceroy of Canada. To the south, the British were said to be openly funding Creek Indian raids on Georgia, and the state was under martial law. Additionally, during Shays' Rebellion (August 1786June 1787) in Massachusetts, Congress could provide no money to support an endangered constituent state. General Benjamin Lincoln was obliged to raise funds from Boston merchants to pay for a volunteer army.

Congress was paralyzed. It could do nothing significant without nine states, and some legislation required all 13. When a state produced only one member in attendance, its vote was not counted. If a state's delegation was evenly divided, its vote could not be counted towards the nine-count requirement. The Congress of the Confederation had "virtually ceased trying to govern". The vision of a "respectable nation" among nations seemed to be fading in the eyes of revolutionaries such as George Washington, Benjamin Franklin, and Rufus King. Their dream of a republic, a nation without hereditary rulers, with power derived from the people in frequent elections, was in doubt.

On February 21, 1787, the Confederation Congress called a convention of state delegates at Philadelphia to propose revisions to the Articles. Unlike earlier attempts, the convention was not meant for new laws or piecemeal alterations, but for the "sole and express purpose of revising the Articles of Confederation". The convention was not limited to commerce; rather, it was intended to "render the federal constitution adequate to the exigencies of government and the preservation of the Union." The proposal might take effect when approved by Congress and the states.

History

1787 drafting

On the appointed day, May 14, 1787, only the Virginia and Pennsylvania delegations were present, and the convention's opening meeting was postponed for lack of a quorum. A quorum of seven states met and deliberations began on May 25. Eventually twelve states were represented; 74 delegates were named, 55 attended and 39 signed. The delegates were generally convinced that an effective central government with a wide range of enforceable powers must replace the weaker Congress established by the Articles of Confederation.

Two plans for structuring the federal government arose at the convention's outset:
 The Virginia Plan (also known as the Large State Plan or the Randolph Plan) proposed that the legislative department of the national government be composed of a Bicameral Congress, with both chambers elected with apportionment according to population. Generally favoring the most highly populated states, it used the philosophy of John Locke to rely on consent of the governed, Montesquieu for divided government, and Edward Coke to emphasize civil liberties.
 The New Jersey Plan proposed that the legislative department be a unicameral body with one vote per state. Generally favoring the less-populous states, it used the philosophy of English Whigs such as Edmund Burke to rely on received procedure and William Blackstone to emphasize sovereignty of the legislature. This position reflected the belief that the states were independent entities and, as they entered the United States of America freely and individually, remained so.

On May 31, the Convention devolved into a "Committee of the Whole" to consider the Virginia Plan. On June 13, the Virginia resolutions in amended form were reported out of committee. The New Jersey Plan was put forward in response to the Virginia Plan.

A "Committee of Eleven" (one delegate from each state represented) met from July 2 to 16 to work out a compromise on the issue of representation in the federal legislature. All agreed to a republican form of government grounded in representing the people in the states. For the legislature, two issues were to be decided: how the votes were to be allocated among the states in the Congress, and how the representatives should be elected. In its report, now known as the Connecticut Compromise (or "Great Compromise"), the committee proposed proportional representation for seats in the House of Representatives based on population (with the people voting for representatives), and equal representation for each State in the Senate (with each state's legislators generally choosing their respective senators), and that all money bills would originate in the House.

The Great Compromise ended the stalemate between "patriots" and "nationalists", leading to numerous other compromises in a spirit of accommodation. There were sectional interests to be balanced by the Three-Fifths Compromise; reconciliation on Presidential term, powers, and method of selection; and jurisdiction of the federal judiciary.

On July 24, a "Committee of Detail"—John Rutledge (South Carolina), Edmund Randolph (Virginia), Nathaniel Gorham (Massachusetts), Oliver Ellsworth (Connecticut), and James Wilson (Pennsylvania)—was elected to draft a detailed constitution reflective of the Resolutions passed by the convention up to that point. The Convention recessed from July 26 to August 6 to await the report of this "Committee of Detail". Overall, the report of the committee conformed to the resolutions adopted by the convention, adding some elements. A twenty-three article (plus preamble) constitution was presented.

From August 6 to September 10, the report of the committee of detail was discussed, section by section and clause by clause. Details were attended to, and further compromises were effected. Toward the close of these discussions, on September 8, a "Committee of Style and Arrangement"—Alexander Hamilton (New York), William Samuel Johnson (Connecticut), Rufus King (Massachusetts), James Madison (Virginia), and Gouverneur Morris (Pennsylvania)—was appointed to distill a final draft constitution from the twenty-three approved articles. The final draft, presented to the convention on September 12, contained seven articles, a preamble and a closing endorsement, of which Morris was the primary author. The committee also presented a proposed letter to accompany the constitution when delivered to Congress.

The final document, engrossed by Jacob Shallus, was taken up on Monday, September 17, at the convention's final session. Several of the delegates were disappointed in the result, a makeshift series of unfortunate compromises. Some delegates left before the ceremony and three others refused to sign. Of the thirty-nine signers, Benjamin Franklin summed up, addressing the convention: "There are several parts of this Constitution which I do not at present approve, but I am not sure I shall never approve them." He would accept the Constitution, "because I expect no better and because I am not sure that it is not the best".

The advocates of the Constitution were anxious to obtain unanimous support of all twelve states represented in the convention. Their accepted formula for the closing endorsement was "Done in Convention, by the unanimous consent of the States present." At the end of the convention, the proposal was agreed to by eleven state delegations and the lone remaining delegate from New York, Alexander Hamilton.

Ratification by the states

Within three days of its signing on September 17, 1787, the Constitution was submitted to the Congress of the Confederation, then sitting in New York City, the nation's temporary capital. The document, originally intended as a revision of the Articles of Confederation, instead introduced a completely new form of government. While members of Congress had the power to reject it, they voted unanimously on September 28 to forward the proposal to the thirteen states for their ratification. Under the process outlined in Article VII of the proposed Constitution, the state legislatures were tasked with organizing "Federal Conventions" to ratify the document. This scheme ignored the amendment process dictated by the Articles of Confederation which required a unanimous vote of all the states. Instead, Article VII called for approval by just nine of the 13 states. a two-thirds majority.

Two factions soon emerged, one supporting the Constitution, the Federalists, and the other opposing it, the so-called Anti-Federalists. Over the ensuing months, the proposal was debated, criticized, and expounded upon clause by clause. In the state of New York, at the time a hotbed of anti-Federalism, three delegates from the Philadelphia Convention who were also members of the Congress—Hamilton, Madison, and Jay—published a series of commentaries, now known as The Federalist Papers, in support of ratification.

Before the year's end, three state legislatures voted in favor of ratification. Delaware was first with a unanimous 30-0 vote, Pennsylvania second, approving the measure 46-23, and New Jersey third with an unanimous vote. As 1788 began, Connecticut and Georgia followed Delaware's lead with almost unanimous votes, but the outcome became less certain as leaders in key states such as Virginia, New York, and Massachusetts expressed concerns over the lack of protections for people's rights. Fearing the prospect of defeat, the Federalists relented, promising that if the Constitution was adopted, amendments would be added to secure individual liberties. With that, the anti-Federalists' position collapsed.

On June 21, 1788, New Hampshire became the ninth state to ratify. Three months later, on September 17, Congress adopted the Constitution as the law of the land. It then passed resolutions setting dates for choosing the first senators and representatives, the first Wednesday of January (January 7, 1789); electing the first president, the first Wednesday of February (February 4); and officially starting the new government, the first Wednesday of March (March 4), when the first Congress would convene. As its final act, the Congress of Confederation agreed to purchase 10 square miles from Maryland and Virginia for establishing a permanent capital.

Influences

Enlightenment and Rule of law

John LockeTwo Treatises of Governmentlife, liberty and property
Several ideas in the constitution were new. These were associated with the combination of consolidated government along with federal relationships with constituent states.

The Due Process Clause of the constitution was partly based on common law and on Magna Carta (1215), which had become a foundation of English liberty against arbitrary power wielded by a ruler.

Among the most prominent political theorists of the late eighteenth century were William Blackstone, John Locke, and Montesquieu.

Both the influence of Edward Coke and William Blackstone were evident at the convention. In his Institutes of the Lawes of England, Edward Coke interpreted Magna Carta protections and rights to apply not just to nobles, but to all British subjects. In writing the Virginia Charter of 1606, he enabled the King in Parliament to give those to be born in the colonies all rights and liberties as though they were born in England. William Blackstone's Commentaries on the Laws of England were the most influential books on law in the new republic.

British political philosopher John Locke following the Glorious Revolution (1688) was a major influence expanding on the contract theory of government advanced by Thomas Hobbes. Locke advanced the principle of consent of the governed in his Two Treatises of Government. Government's duty under a social contract among the sovereign people was to serve the people by protecting their rights. These basic rights were life, liberty and property.

Montesquieu's influence on the framers is evident in Madison's Federalist No. 47 and Hamilton's Federalist No. 78. Jefferson, Adams, and Mason were known to read Montesquieu. Supreme Court Justices, the ultimate interpreters of the constitution, have cited Montesquieu throughout the Court's history. (See, e.g.) Montesquieu emphasized the need for balanced forces pushing against each other to prevent tyranny (reflecting the influence of Polybius's 2nd century BC treatise on the checks and balances of the Roman Republic). In his The Spirit of Law, Montesquieu argues that the separation of state powers should be by its service to the people's liberty: legislative, executive and judicial.

A substantial body of thought had been developed from the literature of republicanism in the United States, including work by John Adams and applied to the creation of state constitutions.

The constitution was a federal one, and was influenced by the study of other federations, both ancient and extant.

The United States Bill of Rights consists of 10 amendments added to the Constitution in 1791, as supporters of the Constitution had promised critics during the debates of 1788. The English Bill of Rights (1689) was an inspiration for the American Bill of Rights. Both require jury trials, contain a right to keep and bear arms, prohibit excessive bail and forbid "cruel and unusual punishments". Many liberties protected by state constitutions and the Virginia Declaration of Rights were incorporated into the Bill of Rights.

Original frame

Neither the Convention which drafted the Constitution nor the Congress which sent it to the 13 states for ratification in the autumn of 1787, gave it a lead caption. To fill this void, the document was most often titled "A frame of Government" when it was printed for the convenience of ratifying conventions and the information of the public. This Frame of Government consisted of a preamble, seven articles and a signed closing endorsement.

Preamble

The Preamble, the Constitution's introductory paragraph, lays out the purposes of the new government:

The opening words, "We the People", represented a new thought: the idea that the people and not the states were the source of the government's legitimacy. Coined by Gouverneur Morris of Pennsylvania, who chaired the convention's Committee of Style, the phrase is considered an improvement on the section's original draft which followed the word we with a list of the 13 states. In addition, in place of the names of the states, Morris provided a summary of the Constitution's six goals, none of which were mentioned originally.

Article I

Article I describes the Congress, the legislative branch of the federal government. Section 1, reads, "All legislative powers herein granted shall be vested in a Congress of the United States, which shall consist of a Senate and House of Representatives." The article establishes the manner of election and the qualifications of members of each body. Representatives must be at least 25 years old, be a citizen of the United States for seven years, and live in the state they represent. Senators must be at least 30 years old, be a citizen for nine years, and live in the state they represent.

Article I, Section 8 enumerates the powers delegated to the legislature. Financially, Congress has the power to tax, borrow, pay debt and provide for the common defense and the general welfare; to regulate commerce, bankruptcies, and coin money. To regulate internal affairs, it has the power to regulate and govern military forces and militias, suppress insurrections and repel invasions. It is to provide for naturalization, standards of weights and measures, post offices and roads, and patents; to directly govern the federal district and cessions of land by the states for forts and arsenals. Internationally, Congress has the power to define and punish piracies and offenses against the Law of Nations, to declare war and make rules of war. The final Necessary and Proper Clause, also known as the Elastic Clause, expressly confers incidental powers upon Congress without the Articles' requirement for express delegation for each and every power. Article I, Section 9 lists eight specific limits on congressional power.

The Supreme Court has sometimes broadly interpreted the Commerce Clause and the Necessary and Proper Clause in Article One to allow Congress to enact legislation that is neither expressly allowed by the enumerated powers nor expressly denied in the limitations on Congress. In McCulloch v. Maryland (1819), the Supreme Court read the Necessary and Proper Clause to permit the federal government to take action that would "enable [it] to perform the high duties assigned to it [by the Constitution] in the manner most beneficial to the people", even if that action is not itself within the enumerated powers. Chief Justice Marshall clarified: "Let the end be legitimate, let it be within the scope of the Constitution, and all means which are appropriate, which are plainly adapted to that end, which are not prohibited, but consist with the letter and spirit of the Constitution, are Constitutional."

Article II

Article II describes the office, qualifications, and duties of the President of the United States and the Vice President. The President is head of the executive branch of the federal government, as well as the nation's head of state and head of government.

Article two is modified by the 12th Amendment which tacitly acknowledges political parties, and the 25th Amendment relating to office succession. The president is to receive only one compensation from the federal government. The inaugural oath is specified to preserve, protect and defend the Constitution.

The president is the Commander in Chief of the United States Armed Forces, as well as of state militias when they are mobilized. The president makes treaties with the advice and consent of a two-thirds quorum of the Senate. To administer the federal government, the president commissions all the offices of the federal government as Congress directs; and may require the opinions of its principal officers and make "recess appointments" for vacancies that may happen during the recess of the Senate. The president ensures the laws are faithfully executed and may grant reprieves and pardons with the exception of Congressional impeachment. The president reports to Congress on the State of the Union, and by the Recommendation Clause, recommends "necessary and expedient" national measures. The president may convene and adjourn Congress under special circumstances.

Section 4 provides for the removal of the president and other federal officers. The president is removed on impeachment for, and conviction of, treason, bribery, or other high crimes and misdemeanors.

Article III 

Article III describes the court system (the judicial branch), including the Supreme Court.  The article describes the kinds of cases the court takes as original jurisdiction.  Congress can create lower courts and an appeals process, and enacts law defining crimes and punishments.  Article Three also protects the right to trial by jury in all criminal cases, and defines the crime of treason.

Section 1 vests the judicial power of the United States in federal courts, and with it, the authority to interpret and apply the law to a particular case. Also included is the power to punish, sentence, and direct future action to resolve conflicts. The Constitution outlines the U.S. judicial system. In the Judiciary Act of 1789, Congress began to fill in details. Currently, Title 28 of the U.S. Code describes judicial powers and administration.

As of the First Congress, the Supreme Court justices rode circuit to sit as panels to hear appeals from the district courts. In 1891, Congress enacted a new system. District courts would have original jurisdiction. Intermediate appellate courts (circuit courts) with exclusive jurisdiction heard regional appeals before consideration by the Supreme Court. The Supreme Court holds discretionary jurisdiction, meaning that it does not have to hear every case that is brought to it.

To enforce judicial decisions, the Constitution grants federal courts both criminal contempt and civil contempt powers.  Other implied powers include injunctive relief and the habeas corpus remedy.  The Court may imprison for contumacy, bad-faith litigation, and failure to obey a writ of mandamus. Judicial power includes that granted by Acts of Congress for rules of law and punishment. Judicial power also extends to areas not covered by statute. Generally, federal courts cannot interrupt state court proceedings.

Clause1 of Section2 authorizes the federal courts to hear actual cases and controversies only. Their judicial power does not extend to cases that are hypothetical, or which are proscribed due to standing, mootness, or ripeness issues. Generally, a case or controversy requires the presence of adverse parties who have some interest genuinely at stake in the case.

Clause 2 of Section 2 provides that the Supreme Court has original jurisdiction in cases involving ambassadors, ministers, and consuls, for all cases respecting foreign nation-states, and also in those controversies which are subject to federal judicial power because at least one state is a party. Cases arising under the laws of the United States and its treaties come under the jurisdiction of federal courts. Cases under international maritime law and conflicting land grants of different states come under federal courts. Cases between U.S. citizens in different states, and cases between U.S. citizens and foreign states and their citizens, come under federal jurisdiction. The trials will be in the state where the crime was committed.

No part of the Constitution expressly authorizes judicial review, but the Framers did contemplate the idea, and precedent has since established that the courts could exercise judicial review over the actions of Congress or the executive branch. Two conflicting federal laws are under "pendent" jurisdiction if one presents a strict constitutional issue. Federal court jurisdiction is rare when a state legislature enacts something as under federal jurisdiction. To establish a federal system of national law, considerable effort goes into developing a spirit of comity between federal government and states. By the doctrine of 'Res judicata', federal courts give "full faith and credit" to State Courts. The Supreme Court will decide Constitutional issues of state law only on a case-by-case basis, and only by strict Constitutional necessity, independent of state legislators' motives, their policy outcomes or its national wisdom.

Section 3 bars Congress from changing or modifying Federal law on treason by simple majority statute. This section also defines treason, as an overt act of making war or materially helping those at war with the United States. Accusations must be corroborated by at least two witnesses. Congress is a political body and political disagreements routinely encountered should never be considered as treason. This allows for nonviolent resistance to the government because opposition is not a life or death proposition. However, Congress does provide for other lesser subversive crimes such as conspiracy.

Article IV

Article IV outlines the relations among the states and between each state and the federal government. In addition, it provides for such matters as admitting new states and border changes between the states. For instance, it requires states to give "full faith and credit" to the public acts, records, and court proceedings of the other states. Congress is permitted to regulate the manner in which proof of such acts may be admitted. The "privileges and immunities" clause prohibits state governments from discriminating against citizens of other states in favor of resident citizens. For instance, in criminal sentencing, a state may not increase a penalty on the grounds that the convicted person is a non-resident.

It also establishes extradition between the states, as well as laying down a legal basis for freedom of movement and travel amongst the states. Today, this provision is sometimes taken for granted, but in the days of the Articles of Confederation, crossing state lines was often arduous and costly. The Territorial Clause gives Congress the power to make rules for disposing of federal property and governing non-state territories of the United States. Finally, the fourth section of Article Four requires the United States to guarantee to each state a republican form of government, and to protect them from invasion and violence.

Article V

Article V outlines the process for amending the Constitution. Eight state constitutions in effect in 1787 included an amendment mechanism. Amendment-making power rested with the legislature in three of the states and in the other five it was given to specially elected conventions. The Articles of Confederation provided that amendments were to be proposed by Congress and ratified by the unanimous vote of all 13 state legislatures. This proved to be a major flaw in the Articles, as it created an insurmountable obstacle to constitutional reform. The amendment process crafted during the Philadelphia Constitutional Convention was, according to The Federalist No. 43, designed to establish a balance between pliancy and rigidity:

There are two steps in the amendment process. Proposals to amend the Constitution must be properly adopted and ratified before they change the Constitution. First, there are two procedures for adopting the language of a proposed amendment, either by (a) Congress, by two-thirds majority in both the Senate and the House of Representatives, or (b) national convention (which shall take place whenever two-thirds of the state legislatures collectively call for one). Second, there are two procedures for ratifying the proposed amendment, which requires three-fourths of the states' (presently 38 of 50) approval: (a) consent of the state legislatures, or (b) consent of state ratifying conventions. The ratification method is chosen by Congress for each amendment. State ratifying conventions were used only once, for the Twenty-first Amendment.

Presently, the Archivist of the United States is charged with responsibility for administering the ratification process under the provisions of 1U.S. Code . The Archivist submits the proposed amendment to the states for their consideration by sending a letter of notification to each Governor. Each Governor then formally submits the amendment to their state's legislature. When a state ratifies a proposed amendment, it sends the Archivist an original or certified copy of the state's action. Ratification documents are examined by the Office of the Federal Register for facial legal sufficiency and an authenticating signature.

Article Five ends by shielding certain clauses in the new frame of government from being amended. Article One, Section 9, Clause1 prevents Congress from passing any law that would restrict the importation of slaves into the United States prior to 1808, plus the fourth clause from that same section, which reiterates the Constitutional rule that direct taxes must be apportioned according to state populations. These clauses were explicitly shielded from Constitutional amendment prior to 1808. On January 1, 1808, the first day it was permitted to do so, Congress approved legislation prohibiting the importation of slaves into the country. On February 3, 1913, with ratification of the Sixteenth Amendment, Congress gained the authority to levy an income tax without apportioning it among the states or basing it on the United States Census. The third textually entrenched provision is Article One, Section 3, Clauses 1, which provides for equal representation of the states in the Senate. The shield protecting this clause from the amendment process ("no state, without its consent, shall be deprived of its equal Suffrage in the Senate") is less absolute but it is permanent.

Article VI

Article VI establishes that the Constitution and all federal laws and treaties made in accordance with it have supremacy over state laws, and that "the judges in every state shall be bound thereby, any thing in the laws or constitutions of any state notwithstanding." It validates national debt created under the Articles of Confederation and requires that all federal and state legislators, officers, and judges take oaths or affirmations to support the Constitution. This means that the states' constitutions and laws should not conflict with the laws of the federal constitution and that in case of a conflict, state judges are legally bound to honor the federal laws and constitution over those of any state. Article Six also states "no religious Test shall ever be required as a Qualification to any Office or public Trust under the United States."

Article VII

Article VII describes the process for establishing the proposed new frame of government. Anticipating that the influence of many state politicians would be Antifederalist, delegates to the Philadelphia Convention provided for ratification of the Constitution by popularly elected ratifying conventions in each state. The convention method also made it possible that judges, ministers and others ineligible to serve in state legislatures, could be elected to a convention. Suspecting that Rhode Island, at least, might not ratify, delegates decided that the Constitution would go into effect as soon as nine states (two-thirds rounded up) ratified. Each of the remaining four states could then join the newly-formed union by ratifying.

Closing endorsement

The signing of the United States Constitution occurred on September 17, 1787, when 39 delegates to the Constitutional Convention endorsed the constitution created during the convention. In addition to signatures, this closing endorsement, the Constitution's eschatocol, included a brief declaration that the delegates' work has been successfully completed and that those whose signatures appear on it subscribe to the final document. Included are a statement pronouncing the document's adoption by the states present, a formulaic dating of its adoption, and the signatures of those endorsing it. Additionally, the convention's secretary, William Jackson, added a note to verify four amendments made by hand to the final document, and signed the note to authenticate its validity.

The language of the concluding endorsement, conceived by Gouverneur Morris and presented to the convention by Benjamin Franklin, was made intentionally ambiguous in hopes of winning over the votes of dissenting delegates. Advocates for the new frame of government, realizing the impending difficulty of obtaining the consent of the states needed to make it operational, were anxious to obtain the unanimous support of the delegations from each state. It was feared that many of the delegates would refuse to give their individual assent to the Constitution. Therefore, in order that the action of the convention would appear to be unanimous, the formula, Done in convention by the unanimous consent of the states present... was devised.

The document is dated: "the Seventeenth Day of September in the Year of our Lord" 1787, and "of the Independence of the United States of America the Twelfth." This two-fold epoch dating serves to place the Constitution in the context of the religious traditions of Western civilization and, at the same time, links it to the regime principles proclaimed in the Declaration of Independence. This dual reference can also be found in the Articles of Confederation and the Northwest Ordinance.

The closing endorsement serves an authentication function only. It neither assigns powers to the federal government nor does it provide specific limitations on government action. It does, however, provide essential documentation of the Constitution's validity, a statement of "This is what was agreed to." It records who signed the Constitution, and when and where.

Amending the Constitution

The procedure for amending the Constitution is outlined in Article Five (see above). The process is overseen by the archivist of the United States. Between 1949 and 1985, it was overseen by the administrator of General Services, and before that by the secretary of state.

Under Article Five, a proposal for an amendment must be adopted either by two-thirds of both houses of Congress or by a national convention that had been requested by two-thirds of the state legislatures. Once the proposal has passed by either method, Congress must decide whether the proposed amendment is to be ratified by state legislatures or by state ratifying conventions. The proposed amendment along with the method of ratification is sent to the Office of the Federal Register, which copies it in slip law format and submits it to the states. To date, the convention method of proposal has never been tried and the convention method of ratification has only been used once, for the Twenty-first Amendment.

A proposed amendment becomes an operative part of the Constitution as soon as it is ratified by three-fourths of the States (currently 38 of the 50 states). There is no further step. The text requires no additional action by Congress or anyone else after ratification by the required number of states. Thus, when the Office of the Federal Register verifies that it has received the required number of authenticated ratification documents, it drafts a formal proclamation for the Archivist to certify that the amendment is valid and has become part of the nation's frame of government. This certification is published in the Federal Register and United States Statutes at Large and serves as official notice to Congress and to the nation that the ratification process has been successfully completed.

Ratified amendments

The Constitution has twenty-seven amendments. Structurally, the Constitution's original text and all prior amendments remain untouched. The precedent for this practice was set in 1789, when Congress considered and proposed the first several Constitutional amendments. Among these, Amendments 1–10 are collectively known as the Bill of Rights, and Amendments 13–15 are known as the Reconstruction Amendments. The Twenty-sixth Amendment was ratified in the shortest time,  days. The average ratification time for the first twenty-six amendments was 1year, 252 days; for all twenty-seven, 9years, 48 days.

Safeguards of liberty (Amendments 1, 2, and 3)

The First Amendment (1791) prohibits Congress from obstructing the exercise of certain individual freedoms: freedom of religion, freedom of speech, freedom of the press, freedom of assembly, and right to petition. Its Free Exercise Clause guarantees a person's right to hold whatever religious beliefs they want, and to freely exercise that belief, and its Establishment Clause prevents the federal government from creating an official national church or favoring one set of religious beliefs over another. The amendment guarantees an individual's right to express and to be exposed to a wide range of opinions and views. It was intended to ensure a free exchange of ideas, even unpopular ones. It also guarantees an individual's right to physically gather or associate with others in groups for economic, political or religious purposes. Additionally, it guarantees an individual's right to petition the government for a redress of grievances.

The Second Amendment (1791) protects the right of individuals to keep and bear arms. Although the Supreme Court has ruled that this right applies to individuals, not merely to collective militias, it has also held that the government may regulate or place some limits on the manufacture, ownership and sale of firearms or other weapons. Requested by several states during the Constitutional ratification debates, the amendment reflected the lingering resentment over the widespread efforts of the British to confiscate the colonists' firearms at the outbreak of the Revolutionary War. Patrick Henry had rhetorically asked, shall we be stronger, "when we are totally disarmed, and when a British Guard shall be stationed in every house?"

The Third Amendment (1791) prohibits the federal government from forcing individuals to provide lodging to soldiers in their homes during peacetime without their consent. Requested by several states during the Constitutional ratification debates, the amendment reflected the lingering resentment over the Quartering Acts passed by the British Parliament during the Revolutionary War, which had allowed British soldiers to take over private homes for their own use.

Safeguards of justice (Amendments 4, 5, 6, 7, and 8)

The Fourth Amendment (1791) protects people against unreasonable searches and seizures of either self or property by government officials. A search can mean everything from a frisking by a police officer or to a demand for a blood test to a search of an individual's home or car. A seizure occurs when the government takes control of an individual or something in the possession of the individual. Items that are seized often are used as evidence when the individual is charged with a crime. It also imposes certain limitations on police investigating a crime and prevents the use of illegally obtained evidence at trial.

The Fifth Amendment (1791) establishes the requirement that a trial for a major crime may commence only after an indictment has been handed down by a grand jury; protects individuals from double jeopardy, being tried and put in danger of being punished more than once for the same criminal act; prohibits punishment without due process of law, thus protecting individuals from being imprisoned without fair procedures; and provides that an accused person may not be compelled to reveal to the police, prosecutor, judge, or jury any information that might incriminate or be used against him or her in a court of law. Additionally, the Fifth Amendment also prohibits government from taking private property for public use without "just compensation", the basis of eminent domain in the United States.

The Sixth Amendment (1791) provides several protections and rights to an individual accused of a crime. The accused has the right to a fair and speedy trial by a local and impartial jury. Likewise, a person has the right to a public trial. This right protects defendants from secret proceedings that might encourage abuse of the justice system, and serves to keep the public informed. This amendment also guarantees a right to legal counsel if accused of a crime, guarantees that the accused may require witnesses to attend the trial and testify in the presence of the accused, and guarantees the accused a right to know the charges against them. In 1966, the Supreme Court ruled that, with the Fifth Amendment, this amendment requires what has become known as the Miranda warning.

The Seventh Amendment (1791) extends the right to a jury trial to federal civil cases, and inhibits courts from overturning a jury's findings of fact. Although the Seventh Amendment itself says that it is limited to "suits at common law", meaning cases that triggered the right to a jury under English law, the amendment has been found to apply in lawsuits that are similar to the old common law cases. For example, the right to a jury trial applies to cases brought under federal statutes that prohibit race or gender discrimination in housing or employment. Importantly, this amendment guarantees the right to a jury trial only in federal court, not in state court.

The Eighth Amendment (1791) protects people from having bail or fines set at an amount so high that it would be impossible for all but the richest defendants to pay and also protects people from being subjected to cruel and unusual punishment. Although this phrase originally was intended to outlaw certain gruesome methods of punishment, it has been broadened over the years to protect against punishments that are grossly disproportionate to or too harsh for the particular crime. This provision has also been used to challenge prison conditions such as extremely unsanitary cells, overcrowding, insufficient medical care and deliberate failure by officials to protect inmates from one another.

Unenumerated rights and reserved powers (Amendments 9 and 10)

The Ninth Amendment (1791) declares that individuals have other fundamental rights, in addition to those stated in the Constitution. During the Constitutional ratification debates Anti-Federalists argued that a Bill of Rights should be added. The Federalists opposed it on grounds that a list would necessarily be incomplete but would be taken as explicit and exhaustive, thus enlarging the power of the federal government by implication. The Anti-Federalists persisted, and several state ratification conventions refused to ratify the Constitution without a more specific list of protections, so the First Congress added what became the Ninth Amendment as a compromise. Because the rights protected by the Ninth Amendment are not specified, they are referred to as "unenumerated". The Supreme Court has found that unenumerated rights include such important rights as the right to travel, the right to vote, the right to privacy, and the right to make important decisions about one's health care or body.

The Tenth Amendment (1791) was included in the Bill of Rights to further define the balance of power between the federal government and the states. The amendment states that the federal government has only those powers specifically granted by the Constitution. These powers include the power to declare war, to collect taxes, to regulate interstate business activities and others that are listed in the articles or in subsequent constitutional amendments. Any power not listed is, says the Tenth Amendment, left to the states or the people. While there is no specific list of what these "reserved powers" may be, the Supreme Court has ruled that laws affecting family relations, commerce within a state's own borders, abortion, and local law enforcement activities, are among those specifically reserved to the states or the people.

Governmental authority (Amendments 11, 16, 18, and 21)

The Eleventh Amendment (1795) specifically prohibits federal courts from hearing cases in which a state is sued by an individual from another state or another country, thus extending to the states sovereign immunity protection from certain types of legal liability. Article Three, Section 2, Clause 1 has been affected by this amendment, which also overturned the Supreme Court's decision in Chisholm v. Georgia (1793).

The Sixteenth Amendment (1913) removed existing Constitutional constraints that limited the power of Congress to lay and collect taxes on income. Specifically, the apportionment constraints delineated in Article 1, Section 9, Clause 4 have been removed by this amendment, which also overturned an 1895 Supreme Court decision, in Pollock v. Farmers' Loan & Trust Co., that declared an unapportioned federal income tax on rents, dividends, and interest unconstitutional. This amendment has become the basis for all subsequent federal income tax legislation and has greatly expanded the scope of federal taxing and spending in the years since.

The Eighteenth Amendment (1919) prohibited the making, transporting, and selling of alcoholic beverages nationwide. It also authorized Congress to enact legislation enforcing this prohibition. Adopted at the urging of a national temperance movement, proponents believed that the use of alcohol was reckless and destructive and that prohibition would reduce crime and corruption, solve social problems, decrease the need for welfare and prisons, and improve the health of all Americans. During prohibition, it is estimated that alcohol consumption and alcohol related deaths declined dramatically. But prohibition had other, more negative consequences. The amendment drove the lucrative alcohol business underground, giving rise to a large and pervasive black market. In addition, prohibition encouraged disrespect for the law and strengthened organized crime. Prohibition came to an end in 1933, when this amendment was repealed.

The Twenty-first Amendment (1933) repealed the Eighteenth Amendment and returned the regulation of alcohol to the states. Each state sets its own rules for the sale and importation of alcohol, including the drinking age. Because a federal law provides federal funds to states that prohibit the sale of alcohol to minors under the age of twenty-one, all fifty states have set their drinking age there. Rules about how alcohol is sold vary greatly from state to state.

Safeguards of civil rights (Amendments 13, 14, 15, 19, 23, 24, and 26)

The Thirteenth Amendment (1865) abolished slavery and involuntary servitude, except as punishment for a crime, and authorized Congress to enforce abolition. Though millions of slaves had been declared free by the 1863 Emancipation Proclamation, their post Civil War status was unclear, as was the status of other millions. Congress intended the Thirteenth Amendment to be a proclamation of freedom for all slaves throughout the nation and to take the question of emancipation away from politics. This amendment rendered inoperative or moot several of the original parts of the constitution.

The Fourteenth Amendment (1868) granted United States citizenship to former slaves and to all persons "subject to U.S. jurisdiction". It also contained three new limits on state power: a state shall not violate a citizen's privileges or immunities; shall not deprive any person of life, liberty, or property without due process of law; and must guarantee all persons equal protection of the laws. These limitations dramatically expanded the protections of the Constitution. This amendment, according to the Supreme Court's Doctrine of Incorporation, makes most provisions of the Bill of Rights applicable to state and local governments as well. It superseded the mode of apportionment of representatives delineated in Article 1, Section 2, Clause 3, and also overturned the Supreme Court's decision in Dred Scott v. Sandford (1857).

The Fifteenth Amendment (1870) prohibits the use of race, color, or previous condition of servitude in determining which citizens may vote. The last of three post Civil War Reconstruction Amendments, it sought to abolish one of the key vestiges of slavery and to advance the civil rights and liberties of former slaves.

The Nineteenth Amendment (1920) prohibits the government from denying women the right to vote on the same terms as men. Prior to the amendment's adoption, only a few states permitted women to vote and to hold office.

The Twenty-third Amendment (1961) extends the right to vote in presidential elections to citizens residing in the District of Columbia by granting the District electors in the Electoral College, as if it were a state. When first established as the nation's capital in 1800, the District of Columbia's five thousand residents had neither a local government, nor the right to vote in federal elections. By 1960 the population of the District had grown to over 760,000.

The Twenty-fourth Amendment (1964) prohibits a poll tax for voting. Although passage of the Thirteenth, Fourteenth, and Fifteenth Amendments helped remove many of the discriminatory laws left over from slavery, they did not eliminate all forms of discrimination. Along with literacy tests and durational residency requirements, poll taxes were used to keep low-income (primarily African American) citizens from participating in elections. The Supreme Court has since struck down these discriminatory measures, opening democratic participation to all.

The Twenty-sixth Amendment (1971) prohibits the government from denying the right of United States citizens, eighteen years of age or older, to vote on account of age. The drive to lower the voting age was driven in large part by the broader student activism movement protesting the Vietnam War. It gained strength following the Supreme Court's decision in Oregon v. Mitchell (1970).

Government processes and procedures (Amendments 12, 17, 20, 22, 25, and 27)

The Twelfth Amendment (1804) modifies the way the Electoral College chooses the President and Vice President. It stipulates that each elector must cast a distinct vote for president and Vice President, instead of two votes for president. It also suggests that the President and Vice President should not be from the same state. Article II, Section 1, Clause 3 is superseded by this amendment, which also extends the eligibility requirements to become president to the Vice President.

The Seventeenth Amendment (1913) modifies the way senators are elected. It stipulates that senators are to be elected by direct popular vote. The amendment supersedes Article 1, Section 2, Clauses1 and 2, under which the two senators from each state were elected by the state legislature. It also allows state legislatures to permit their governors to make temporary appointments until a special election can be held.

The Twentieth Amendment (1933) changes the date on which a new president, Vice President and Congress take office, thus shortening the time between Election Day and the beginning of Presidential, Vice Presidential and Congressional terms. Originally, the Constitution provided that the annual meeting was to be on the first Monday in December unless otherwise provided by law. This meant that, when a new Congress was elected in November, it did not come into office until the following March, with a "lame duck" Congress convening in the interim. By moving the beginning of the president's new term from March 4 to January 20 (and in the case of Congress, to January 3), proponents hoped to put an end to lame duck sessions, while allowing for a speedier transition for the new administration and legislators.

The Twenty-second Amendment (1951) limits an elected president to two terms in office, a total of eight years. However, under some circumstances it is possible for an individual to serve more than eight years. Although nothing in the original frame of government limited how many presidential terms one could serve, the nation's first president, George Washington, declined to run for a third term, suggesting that two terms of four years were enough for any president. This precedent remained an unwritten rule of the presidency until broken by Franklin D. Roosevelt, who was elected to a third term as president 1940 and in 1944 to a fourth.

The Twenty-fifth Amendment (1967) clarifies what happens upon the death, removal, or resignation of the President or Vice President and how the Presidency is temporarily filled if the President becomes disabled and cannot fulfill the responsibilities of the office. It supersedes the ambiguous succession rule established in Article II, Section 1, Clause 6. A concrete plan of succession has been needed on multiple occasions since 1789. However, for nearly 20% of U.S. history, there has been no vice president in office who can assume the presidency.

The Twenty-seventh Amendment (1992) prevents members of Congress from granting themselves pay raises during the current session. Rather, any raises that are adopted must take effect during the next session of Congress. Its proponents believed that Federal legislators would be more likely to be cautious about increasing congressional pay if they have no personal stake in the vote. Article One, section 6, Clause 1 has been affected by this amendment, which remained pending for over two centuries as it contained no time limit for ratification.

Unratified amendments

Collectively, members of the House and Senate propose around 150 amendments during each two-year term of Congress. Most however, never get out of the Congressional committees in which they are proposed, and only a fraction of those approved in committee receive sufficient support to win Congressional approval and actually enter the constitutional ratification process.

Six amendments approved by Congress and proposed to the states for consideration have not been ratified by the required number of states to become part of the Constitution. Four of these are technically still pending, as Congress did not set a time limit (see also Coleman v. Miller) for their ratification. The other two are no longer pending, as both had a time limit attached and in both cases the time period set for their ratification expired.

Pending

 The Congressional Apportionment Amendment (proposed 1789) would, if ratified, establish a formula for determining the appropriate size of the House of Representatives and the appropriate apportionment of representatives among the states following each constitutionally mandated decennial census. At the time it was sent to the states for ratification, an affirmative vote by ten states would have made this amendment operational. In 1791 and 1792, when Vermont and Kentucky joined the Union, the number climbed to twelve. Thus, the amendment remained one state shy of the number needed for it to become part of the Constitution. No additional states have ratified this amendment since. To become part of the Constitution today, ratification by an additional twenty-seven would be required. The Apportionment Act of 1792 apportioned the House of Representatives at 33,000 persons per representative in consequence of the 1790 census. Reapportionment has since been effected by statute.
 The Titles of Nobility Amendment (proposed 1810) would, if ratified, strip United States citizenship from any citizen who accepted a title of nobility from a foreign country. When submitted to the states, ratification by thirteen states was required for it to become part of the Constitution; eleven had done so by early 1812. However, with the addition of Louisiana into the Union that year (April 30, 1812), the ratification threshold rose to fourteen. Thus, when New Hampshire ratified it in December 1812, the amendment again came within two states of being ratified. No additional states have ratified this amendment since. To become part of the Constitution today, ratification by an additional twenty-six would be required.
 The Corwin Amendment (proposed 1861) would, if ratified, shield "domestic institutions" of the states (which in 1861 included slavery) from the constitutional amendment process and from abolition or interference by Congress. This proposal was one of several measures considered by Congress in an ultimately unsuccessful attempt to attract the seceding states back into the Union and to entice border slave states to stay. Five states ratified the amendment in the early 1860s, but none have since. To become part of the Constitution today, ratification by an additional 33 states would be required. The subject of this proposal was subsequently addressed by the 1865 Thirteenth Amendment, which abolished slavery.
 The Child Labor Amendment (proposed 1924) would, if ratified, specifically authorize Congress to limit, regulate and prohibit labor of persons less than eighteen years of age. The amendment was proposed in response to Supreme Court rulings in Hammer v. Dagenhart (1918) and Bailey v. Drexel Furniture Co. (1922) that found federal laws regulating and taxing goods produced by employees under the ages of 14 and 16 unconstitutional. When submitted to the states, ratification by 36 states was required for it to become part of the Constitution, as there were forty-eight states. Twenty-eight had ratified the amendment by early 1937, but none have done so since. To become part of the Constitution today, ratification by an additional ten would be required. A federal statute approved June 25, 1938, regulated the employment of those under 16 or 18 years of age in interstate commerce. The Supreme Court, by unanimous vote in United States v. Darby Lumber Co. (1941), found this law constitutional, effectively overturning Hammer v. Dagenhart. As a result of this development, the movement pushing for the amendment concluded.

Expired

 The Equal Rights Amendment (proposed 1972) would have prohibited deprivation of equality of rights (discrimination) by the federal or state governments on account of sex. A seven-year ratification time limit was initially placed on the amendment, but as the deadline approached, Congress granted a three-year extension. Thirty-five states ratified the proposed amendment prior to the original deadline, three short of the number required for it to be implemented (five of them later voted to rescind their ratification). No further states ratified the amendment within the extended deadline. In 2017, Nevada became the first state to ratify the ERA after the expiration of both deadlines, followed by Illinois in 2018, and Virginia in 2020, purportedly bringing the number of ratifications to 38. However, experts and advocates have acknowledged legal uncertainty about the consequences of these ratifications, due to the expired deadlines and the five states' purported revocations.
 The District of Columbia Voting Rights Amendment (proposed 1978) would have granted the District of Columbia full representation in the United States Congress as if it were a state, repealed the Twenty-third Amendment, granted the District unconditional Electoral College voting rights, and allowed its participation in the process by which the Constitution is amended. A seven-year ratification time limit was placed on the amendment. Sixteen states ratified the amendment (twenty-two short of the number required for it to be implemented) prior to the deadline, thus it failed to be adopted.

Judicial review

The way the Constitution is understood is influenced by court decisions, especially those of the Supreme Court. These decisions are referred to as precedents. Judicial review is the power of the Court to examine federal legislation, federal executive, and all state branches of government, to decide their constitutionality, and to strike them down if found unconstitutional.

Judicial review includes the power of the Court to explain the meaning of the Constitution as it applies to particular cases. Over the years, Court decisions on issues ranging from governmental regulation of radio and television to the rights of the accused in criminal cases have changed the way many constitutional clauses are interpreted, without amendment to the actual text of the Constitution.

Legislation passed to implement the Constitution, or to adapt those implementations to changing conditions, broadens and, in subtle ways, changes the meanings given to the words of the Constitution. Up to a point, the rules and regulations of the many federal executive agencies have a similar effect. If an action of Congress or the agencies is challenged, however, it is the court system that ultimately decides whether these actions are permissible under the Constitution.

Scope and theory

Courts established by the Constitution can regulate government under the Constitution, the supreme law of the land. First, they have jurisdiction over actions by an officer of government and state law. Second, federal courts may rule on whether coordinate branches of national government conform to the Constitution. Until the twentieth century, the Supreme Court of the United States may have been the only high tribunal in the world to use a court for constitutional interpretation of fundamental law, others generally depending on their national legislature.

The basic theory of American Judicial review is summarized by constitutional legal scholars and historians as follows: the written Constitution is fundamental law within the states. It can change only by extraordinary legislative process of national proposal, then state ratification. The powers of all departments are limited to enumerated grants found in the Constitution. Courts are expected (a) to enforce provisions of the Constitution as the supreme law of the land, and (b) to refuse to enforce anything in conflict with it.

As to judicial review and the Congress, the first proposals by Madison (Virginia) and Wilson (Pennsylvania) called for a supreme court veto over national legislation. In this it resembled the system in New York, where the Constitution of 1777 called for a "Council of Revision" by the governor and justices of the state supreme court. The council would review and in a way, veto any passed legislation violating the spirit of the Constitution before it went into effect. The nationalist's proposal in convention was defeated three times, and replaced by a presidential veto with congressional over-ride. Judicial review relies on the jurisdictional authority in Article III, and the Supremacy Clause.

The justification for judicial review is to be explicitly found in the open ratifications held in the states and reported in their newspapers. John Marshall in Virginia, James Wilson in Pennsylvania and Oliver Ellsworth of Connecticut all argued for Supreme Court judicial review of acts of state legislature. In Federalist No. 78, Alexander Hamilton advocated the doctrine of a written document held as a superior enactment of the people. "A limited constitution can be preserved in practice no other way" than through courts which can declare void any legislation contrary to the Constitution. The preservation of the people's authority over legislatures rests "particularly with judges".

The Supreme Court was initially made up of jurists who had been intimately connected with the framing of the Constitution and the establishment of its government as law.  John Jay (New York), a co-author of The Federalist Papers, served as chief justice for the first six years.  The second and third chief justices, Oliver Ellsworth (Connecticut) and John Rutledge (South Carolina), were delegates to the Constitutional Convention.  Washington's recess appointment as chief justice who served in 1795. John Marshall (Virginia), the fourth chief justice, had served in the Virginia Ratification Convention in 1788.  His 34 years of service on the Court would see some of the most important rulings to help establish the nation the Constitution had begun.  Other early members of the Supreme Court who had been delegates to the Constitutional Convention included James Wilson (Pennsylvania) for ten years, John Blair Jr. (Virginia) for five, and John Rutledge (South Carolina) for one year as a justice, then chief justice in 1795.

Establishment

When John Marshall followed Oliver Ellsworth as chief justice of the Supreme Court in 1801, the federal judiciary had been established by the Judiciary Act, but there were few cases, and less prestige. "The fate of judicial review was in the hands of the Supreme Court itself." Review of state legislation and appeals from state supreme courts was understood. But the Court's life, jurisdiction over state legislation was limited. The Marshall Court's landmark Barron v. Baltimore held that the Bill of Rights restricted only the federal government, and not the states.

In the landmark Marbury v. Madison case, the Supreme Court asserted its authority of judicial review over Acts of Congress. Its findings were that Marbury and the others had a right to their commissions as judges in the District of Columbia. Marshall, writing the opinion for the majority, announced his discovered conflict between Section 13 of the Judiciary Act of 1789 and Article III. In this case, both the Constitution and the statutory law applied to the particulars at the same time. "The very essence of judicial duty" according to Marshall was to determine which of the two conflicting rules should govern. The Constitution enumerates powers of the judiciary to extend to cases arising "under the Constitution". Further, justices take a Constitutional oath to uphold it as "Supreme law of the land". Therefore, since the United States government as created by the Constitution is a limited government, the federal courts were required to choose the Constitution over congressional law if there were deemed to be a conflict.

"This argument has been ratified by time and by practice..." The Supreme Court did not declare another act of Congress unconstitutional until the controversial Dred Scott decision in 1857, held after the voided Missouri Compromise statute had already been repealed. In the eighty years following the Civil War to World War II, the Court voided congressional statutes in 77 cases, on average almost one a year.

Something of a crisis arose when, in 1935 and 1936, the Supreme Court handed down twelve decisions voiding acts of Congress relating to the New Deal. President Franklin D. Roosevelt then responded with his abortive "court packing plan". Other proposals have suggested a Court super-majority to overturn Congressional legislation, or a constitutional amendment to require that the justices retire at a specified age by law. To date, the Supreme Court's power of judicial review has persisted.

Self-restraint

The power of judicial review could not have been preserved long in a democracy unless it had been "wielded with a reasonable measure of judicial restraint, and with some attention, as Mr. Dooley said, to the election returns." Indeed, the Supreme Court has developed a system of doctrine and practice that self-limits its power of judicial review.

The Court controls almost all of its business by choosing what cases to consider, writs of certiorari. In this way, it can avoid opinions on embarrassing or difficult cases. The Supreme Court limits itself by defining for itself what is a "justiciable question". First, the Court is fairly consistent in refusing to make any "advisory opinions" in advance of actual cases. Second, "friendly suits" between those of the same legal interest are not considered. Third, the Court requires a "personal interest", not one generally held, and a legally protected right must be immediately threatened by government action. Cases are not taken up if the litigant has no standing to sue. Simply having the money to sue and being injured by government action are not enough.

These three procedural ways of dismissing cases have led critics to charge that the Supreme Court delays decisions by unduly insisting on technicalities in their "standards of litigability". They say cases are left unconsidered which are in the public interest, with genuine controversy, and resulting from good faith action. "The Supreme Court is not only a court of law but a court of justice."

Separation of powers

The Supreme Court balances several pressures to maintain its roles in national government. It seeks to be a co-equal branch of government, but its decrees must be enforceable. The Court seeks to minimize situations where it asserts itself superior to either president or Congress, but federal officers must be held accountable. The Supreme Court assumes power to declare acts of Congress as unconstitutional but it self-limits its passing on constitutional questions. But the Court's guidance on basic problems of life and governance in a democracy is most effective when American political life reinforce its rulings.

Justice Brandeis summarized four general guidelines that the Supreme Court uses to avoid constitutional decisions relating to Congress: The Court will not anticipate a question of constitutional law nor decide open questions unless a case decision requires it. If it does, a rule of constitutional law is formulated only as the precise facts in the case require. The Court will choose statutes or general law for the basis of its decision if it can without constitutional grounds. If it does, the Court will choose a constitutional construction of an act of Congress, even if its constitutionality is seriously in doubt.

Likewise with the executive department, Edwin Corwin observed that the Court does sometimes rebuff presidential pretensions, but it more often tries to rationalize them. Against Congress, an act is merely "disallowed". In the executive case, exercising judicial review produces "some change in the external world" beyond the ordinary judicial sphere. The "political question" doctrine especially applies to questions which present a difficult enforcement issue. Chief Justice Charles Evans Hughes addressed the Court's limitation when political process allowed future policy change, but a judicial ruling would "attribute finality". Political questions lack "satisfactory criteria for a judicial determination".

John Marshall recognized that the president holds "important political powers" which as executive privilege allows great discretion. This doctrine was applied in Court rulings on President Grant's duty to enforce the law during Reconstruction. It extends to the sphere of foreign affairs. Justice Robert Jackson explained, foreign affairs are inherently political, "wholly confided by our Constitution to the political departments of the government ... [and] not subject to judicial intrusion or inquiry."

Critics of the Court object in two principal ways to self-restraint in judicial review, deferring as it does as a matter of doctrine to acts of Congress and presidential actions.
 Its inaction is said to allow "a flood of legislative appropriations" which permanently create an imbalance between the states and federal government.
 Supreme Court deference to Congress and the executive compromises American protection of civil rights, political minority groups and aliens.

Subsequent Courts

Supreme Courts under the leadership of subsequent chief justices have also used judicial review to interpret the Constitution among individuals, states and federal branches. Notable contributions were made by the Chase Court, the Taft Court, the Warren Court, and the Rehnquist Court.

Salmon P. Chase was a Lincoln appointee, serving as chief justice from 1864 to 1873. His career encompassed service as a U.S. senator and Governor of Ohio. He coined the slogan, "Free soil, free Labor, free men." One of Lincoln's "team of rivals", he was appointed Secretary of Treasury during the Civil War, issuing "greenbacks". Partly to appease the Radical Republicans, Lincoln appointed him chief justice upon the death of Roger B. Taney.

In one of his first official acts, Chase admitted John Rock, the first African-American to practice before the Supreme Court. The Chase Court is famous for Texas v. White, which asserted a permanent Union of indestructible states. Veazie Bank v. Fenno upheld the Civil War tax on state banknotes. Hepburn v. Griswold found parts of the Legal Tender Acts unconstitutional, though it was reversed under a late Supreme Court majority.

William Howard Taft was a Harding appointment to chief justice from 1921 to 1930. A Progressive Republican from Ohio, he was a one-term President.

As chief justice, he advocated the Judiciary Act of 1925 that brought the Federal District Courts under the administrative jurisdiction of the Supreme Court. Taft successfully sought the expansion of Court jurisdiction over non-states such as District of Columbia and Territories of Alaska and Hawaii.

In 1925, the Taft Court issued a ruling overturning a Marshall Court ruling on the Bill of Rights. In Gitlow v. New York, the Court established the doctrine of "incorporation which applied the Bill of Rights to the states. Important cases included the Board of Trade of City of Chicago v. Olsen that upheld Congressional regulation of commerce. Olmstead v. United States allowed exclusion of evidence obtained without a warrant based on application of the 14th Amendment proscription against unreasonable searches. Wisconsin v. Illinois ruled the equitable power of the United States can impose positive action on a state to prevent its inaction from damaging another state.

Earl Warren was an Eisenhower nominee, chief justice from 1953 to 1969. Warren's Republican career in the law reached from county prosecutor, California state attorney general, and three consecutive terms as governor. His programs stressed progressive efficiency, expanding state education, re-integrating returning veterans, infrastructure and highway construction.

In 1954, the Warren Court overturned a landmark Fuller Court ruling on the Fourteenth Amendment interpreting racial segregation as permissible in government and commerce providing "separate but equal" services. Warren built a coalition of justices after 1962 that developed the idea of natural rights as guaranteed in the Constitution. Brown v. Board of Education banned segregation in public schools. Baker v. Carr and Reynolds v. Sims established Court ordered "one-man-one-vote". Bill of Rights Amendments were incorporated into the states. Due process was expanded in Gideon v. Wainwright and Miranda v. Arizona. First Amendment rights were addressed in Griswold v. Connecticut concerning privacy, and Engel v. Vitale relative to free speech.

William Rehnquist was a Reagan appointment to chief justice, serving from 1986 to 2005. While he would concur with overthrowing a state supreme court's decision, as in Bush v. Gore, he built a coalition of Justices after 1994 that developed the idea of federalism as provided for in the Tenth Amendment. In the hands of the Supreme Court, the Constitution and its amendments were to restrain Congress, as in City of Boerne v. Flores.

Nevertheless, the Rehnquist Court was noted in the contemporary "culture wars" for overturning state laws relating to privacy prohibiting late-term abortions in Stenberg v. Carhart, prohibiting sodomy in Lawrence v. Texas, or ruling so as to protect free speech in Texas v. Johnson or affirmative action in Grutter v. Bollinger.

Civic religion

There is a viewpoint that some Americans have come to see the documents of the Constitution, along with the Declaration of Independence and the Bill of Rights, as being a cornerstone of a type of civil religion. This is suggested by the prominent display of the Constitution, along with the Declaration of Independence and the Bill of Rights, in massive, bronze-framed, bulletproof, moisture-controlled glass containers vacuum-sealed in a rotunda by day and in multi-ton bomb-proof vaults by night at the National Archives Building.

The idea of displaying the documents struck one academic critic looking from the point of view of the 1776 or 1789 America as "idolatrous, and also curiously at odds with the values of the Revolution". By 1816, Jefferson wrote that "[s]ome men look at constitutions with sanctimonious reverence and deem them like the Ark of the Covenant, too sacred to be touched". But he saw imperfections and imagined that there could potentially be others, believing as he did that "institutions must advance also".

Some commentators depict the multi-ethnic, multi-sectarian United States as held together by a political orthodoxy, in contrast with a nation state of people having more "natural" ties.

Worldwide influence

The United States Constitution has been a notable model for governance around the world. Its international influence is found in similarities of phrasing and borrowed passages in other constitutions, as well as in the principles of the rule of law, separation of powers and recognition of individual rights.

The American experience of fundamental law with amendments and judicial review has motivated constitutionalists at times when they were considering the possibilities for their nation's future. It informed Abraham Lincoln during the American Civil War, his contemporary and ally Benito Juárez of Mexico, and the second generation of 19th-century constitutional nationalists, José Rizal of the Philippines and Sun Yat-sen of China. The framers of the Australian constitution integrated federal ideas from the U.S. and other constitutions.

Since the latter half of the 20th century, the influence of the United States Constitution may be waning as other countries have revised their constitutions with new influences.

Criticisms

The United States Constitution has faced various criticisms since its inception in 1787.

The Constitution did not originally define who was eligible to vote, allowing each state to determine who was eligible. In the early history of the U.S., most states allowed only white male adult property owners to vote with the notable exception of New Jersey where women were able to vote on the same basis as men. Until the Reconstruction Amendments were adopted between 1865 and 1870, the five years immediately following the American Civil War, the Constitution did not abolish slavery, nor give citizenship and voting rights to former slaves. These amendments did not include a specific prohibition on discrimination in voting on the basis of sex; it took another amendment—the Nineteenth, ratified in 1920—for the Constitution to prohibit any United States citizen from being denied the right to vote on the basis of sex.

According to a 2012 study by David Law of Washington University in St. Louis published in the New York University Law Review, the U.S. Constitution guarantees relatively few rights compared to the constitutions of other countries and contains fewer than half (26 of 60) of the provisions listed in the average bill of rights. It is also one of the few in the world today that still features the right to keep and bear arms; the only others are the constitutions of Guatemala and Mexico.

See also

 Commentaries on the Constitution of the United States by Joseph Story (1833, three volumes)
 Congressional power of enforcement
 Constitution Day (United States)
 The Constitution of the United States of America: Analysis and Interpretation
 Constitution of 3 May 1791
 Constitutionalism in the United States
 Gödel's Loophole
 Founding Fathers of the United States
 Founders Online
 History of democracy
 List of national constitutions (world countries)
 List of proposed amendments to the United States Constitution
 List of sources of law in the United States
 Pocket Constitution
 Second Constitutional Convention of the United States
 Timeline of drafting and ratification of the United States Constitution
 UK constitutional law

Related documents

 Mayflower Compact (1620)
 Fundamental Orders of Connecticut (1639)
 Massachusetts Body of Liberties (1641)
 Virginia Statute for Religious Freedom (1779)
 Constitution of Massachusetts (1780)

Notes

References

Works cited

Further reading

 
 
 
 
 
 
 
 
 Dippel, Horst, British and American Constitutional and Democratic Models (18th–20th Century), EGO - European History Online, Mainz: Institute of European History, 2018, retrieved: March 8, 2021 (pdf).
 
 
 
  Pamphlets written between 1787 and 1788 by Elbridge Gerry, Noah Webster, John Jay, Melancthon Smith, Pelatiah Webster, Tench Coxe, James Wilson, John Dickinson, Alexander Contee Hanson, Edmund Randolph, Richard Henry Lee, George Mason, and David Ramsay. The essay attributed to Gerry was in fact written by Mercy Otis Warren.

External links

U.S. government sources
 The Constitution of the United States Explained, U.S. Congress: legal analysis and interpretation based primarily on Supreme Court case law
 United States Constitution: Library of Congress: web guide with related primary documents and resources
 America's Founding Documents, National Archives: original text and online resources on Declaration of Independence, U.S. Constitution, and Bill of Rights
 Constitution of the United States, U.S. Senate: original text with explanations of each section's meaning over time
 The Constitution of the United States as Amended, GovInfo (govinfo.gov): pdf of full text with explanatory footnotes
 America's Founding Documents, Founders Online, National Archives: searchable database of letters and papers of key founders

Non-governmental sources
 Constitution of the United States, Bill of Rights Institute, pdf of full text without explication
 The Constitution of the United States Audio reading, University of Chicago Law School, mp3 recordings of entire document and individual sections
 
 The Constitution of the United States of America, mobile friendly plain text version
 National Constitution Center

1787 in the United States
1789 establishments in the United States
1789 in American law
1789 in American politics
1789 documents
American political philosophy literature
United States
James Madison
Government documents of the United States
United States Constitution